The Arizona Association of Counties (AACo) was established in 1968 as a member association for all elected officials of Arizona's 15 counties. AACo represents each Arizona county and its elected officials by serving as a liaison to the Arizona State Legislature, United States Congress, other governmental agencies, the media and the public. AACo also sponsors various educational programs and renders professional services for the benefit of its membership and county government.

Organization
AACo is headed by a Board of Directors consisting of five officers elected from the membership at large, one representative from each county, and one representative of each elected county office.

Affiliates
The following organizations are affiliated with the Arizona Association of Counties:

Arizona Association of Assessing Officers
Arizona Association of Superior Court Clerks
Arizona County Attorneys and Sheriffs Association
Arizona Justice of the Peace Association
Arizona Association of County Recorders
Arizona Sheriffs Association
Arizona Association of County School Superintendents
Arizona Association of County Treasurers
Arizona Constables State Association
Arizona Association of Data Processing Administrators
Arizona Association of County Engineers
Arizona County Librarians Association
Arizona County Clerks Association
County Supervisors Association of Arizona
Election Officials of Arizona
Arizona Local Health Officers Association

List of Arizona counties
Apache County
Cochise County
Coconino County
Gila County
Graham County
Greenlee County
La Paz County
Maricopa County
Mohave County
Navajo County
Pima County
Pinal County
Santa Cruz County
Yavapai County
Yuma County

References

External links
Arizona Association of Counties
National Association of Counties
 Arizona Justice of the Peace Association

Arizona counties
Councils of governments
Local government organizations
Organizations based in Arizona